Huddart Parker Ltd was an Australian shipping company trading in various forms between 1876 and 1961. It was one of the seven major coastal shippers in Australia at a time when shipping was the principal means of interstate and trans-Tasman transport. The company started in Geelong, but in 1890 shifted its offices to Melbourne. By 1910 Huddart Parker had grown to rank 24th of the top 100 companies in Australia by asset value. Several of the company's ships served in World War I and World War II. Huddart Parker ceased to be an independent company in 1961, when it was taken over by Bitumen and Oil Refineries Australia Limited.

History

The company was founded on 1 August 1876 in Geelong as Huddart, Parker & Co. Pty. Ltd, by James Huddart, Thomas J. Parker, John. Traill, and Captain T. Webb. Earlier, in the 1850s, James Huddart's uncle, Captain Peter Huddart had made his fortune importing coal for use in the Victorian goldfields. He was the first major operator handling coal from the port of Geelong. Parker was a merchant who arrived in Geelong from London in 1853. The trading activities each built up through the gold-rush era and beyond led to a linking of the businesses of their descendants and successors, to become Huddart Parker & Company.

After 1876 Huddart Parker expanded rapidly. By 1886 it had inaugurated the Melbourne–Adelaide shipping service and in 1882 entered the Sydney–Melbourne trade. During the early 1890s its steamers were running to the principal ports of New South Wales, Victoria, South Australia, Western Australia and Tasmania, and in 1893 it was also trading with ports in New Zealand.

From 1889 there was a three-way competition between the Union Steam Ship Company of New Zealand, Huddart Parker and the Tasmanian Steam Navigation Company (TSNCo) on the Tasmanian routes (Melbourne–Launceston, Hobart–Melbourne and Hobart–Sydney). The TSNCo did not have other routes to absorb their Tasmanian losses, and was bought out by the USSCo in 1891. The rivalry between the USSCo and Huddart Parker lasted to 1895 despite an earlier agreement in 1893. There was undercutting by cheap fares and steamers shadowing each other from port to port. The USSCo Rotomahana and Mararoa would sail alongside the Miowra and Warrimoo, with other ships such as Te Anau and Manapouri sailing before and after thus bracketing the Huddart Parker ships.

One of the original directors, John Traill, had survived the other directors by 1886, and remained chairman until his death in 1916 aged 92. By 1890 Traill had moved the company from offices on the wharves at Geelong to 466 Collins Street, in the heart of Melbourne.

The company registered in Victoria in 1889 as a proprietary company and converted to a public company in 1911.

In 1921 Huddart Parker came to an agreement with the Union Company to establish a joint venture on the Bass Strait where each company owned a 50% stake in the company Tasmanian Steamers.

In World War I five of the company's vessels were requisitioned.  was sunk on 26 June 1918 following collision with a German mine north of Cape Maria van Diemen, New Zealand, killing 26 passengers.

Huddart Parker was taken over by Bitumen and Oil Refineries Australia Limited in October 1961.

Notable ships owned by Huddart Parker

 , bought in 1888 for the Bass Strait trade.
 , bought in 1890, sunk on her first voyage, at the mouth of the Tamar River.
 , trans-Tasman passenger steamer, sunk north of New Zealand in 1902, with a large amount of gold aboard.
 , 1910–42, notable cargo and passenger vessel that was a troopship in both World War I and World War II, sunk in the bombing of Darwin.
 , Trans-Tasman liner, in service 1929–60; requisitioned for war service in 1939.
 TSMV Wanganella, Trans-Tasman liner, in service 1933–62.

References

Further reading

 Barker, Anthony (2001) What Happened When: A Chronology of Australia from 1788, Allen & Unwin, 
 
 Merrett, David (2000) Business Institutions and Behaviour in Australia, Routledge (UK), 
 Plowman, Peter (2004) Ferry to Tasmania, Rosenberg Publishing,

Links

1876 establishments in Australia
Shipping companies of Australia